Frank Atkinson  (13 April 1924 – 30 December 2014) was a British museum director and curator. Atkinson is best known for creating the Beamish Museum near Stanley, County Durham, an open-air 'living' museum on the history of the north of England with a focus on the changes brought to both urban and rural life by the industrialisation of the early 20th century.

Early life
Atkinson was born in Barnsley, West Riding of Yorkshire on 13 April 1924, the oldest son of Ernest, a labourer, and Elfrida, a school teacher and later headmistress. An early interest in fossil collecting later saw him become the youngest member of the Barnsley Naturalist and Scientific Society. He was educated at nearby Mapplewell School and at Barnsley grammar school. During the Second World War he obtained a science degree from the University of Sheffield, whilst also serving as a volunteer with the paratroops.

Career
Atkinson began his working life at a coking plant. However, he spent his weekends and days off as a volunteer worker at Wakefield Museum where he successfully gained employment as a museum assistant. At the age of 25 he became the institution's director; he was the youngest museum director in the country. In 1952, Atkinson became Director of Halifax Museums and Art Gallery with responsibility for Shibden Hall, Bankfield Museum and Belle Vue. In 1958, he was appointed curator of the Bowes Museum, an art museum in Barnard Castle, Teesdale. Here, he first began to realise his vision of creating an English version of the open-air museums he had seen on a trip to Scandinavia in 1952.

In 1966, Atkinson was instrumental in the setting-up of the working party that resulted in the creation of Beamish with him as its first director. The aim was to create an "Open-Air Museum for the purpose of studying, collecting, preserving and exhibiting buildings, machinery, objects and information illustrating the development of industry and the way of life of the North of England". He said of the creation of Beamish Museum: "It is essential that collecting be carried out quickly and on as big a scale as possible. It is now almost too late." To this end, Atkinson initiated a policy of "unselective collecting", saying: "you offer it to us and we will collect it". This method of building up the collection proved highly successful and in addition forged links between the institution and the surrounding community. Beamish was also innovative in its operational arrangements, receiving funding and administrative assistance from a consortium of four neighbouring county councils – Northumberland, Tyne and Wear, Cleveland, and Durham; it was the UK's first museum to be run in this way.

Under Atkinson's direction, Beamish was named the National Heritage 'Museum of the Year' in 1986, and the following year was awarded the title 'European Museum of the Year'. Atkinson attended the latter award ceremony despite having recently had cancer surgery. He retired the same year, although his association with Beamish continued; he served as President of the Friends of Beamish until his death.
Following his retirement, Atkinson was Commissioner with the Museums and Galleries Commission (MGC) and Chairman of the Commission's Registration Committee, until December 1994. He had previously worked as an advisor for a number of national bodies in the museums and galleries sector. He also acted as an advisor to the Thomas Bewick Birthplace Trust, overseeing the handover of its archives to the National Trust in 1991.

Awards and honours
In 1980, Atkinson was awarded the OBE. Durham University conferred Atkinson an honorary doctorate of civil law (DCL) upon his retirement in 1987. He was later awarded the CBE in the 1995 New Year Honours list, for services to the development of museums.

Private life
Atkinson met his wife-to-be, Joan Peirson, when she joined the museum service in Halifax. They married on Valentine's Day 1953, celebrating their 60th wedding anniversary in 2013. They had three sons and from 1982 they lived in Ovingham, Northumberland, where Atkinson assisted in fundraising for repairs to the church tower and later became Vice-Chairman of the Parochial church council. 
Atkinson's hobbies included potholing, an interest he had discovered at the age of 12, as well as photography and collecting Natural History specimens such as beetles, ferns, fossils and minerals.

Death and legacy
Atkinson died on 30 December 2014, after a long illness. Richard Evans, the director of Beamish, told the BBC:  "The word 'visionary' is often overused perhaps, but in Frank's case it really is true. He was a one off, a truly remarkable man, with boundless energy combined with a striking intellect and an infectious curiosity for history. He collected thousands of objects over the years, always interested in typical and everyday items that help tell the story of everyday life – stories that are so often overlooked and forgotten. His life's work was to preserve and study the history of everyday life in the North East and to present this story in a vivid, immersive and accessible way".

Durham county councillor Carl Marshall, chairman of the board at Beamish, said:  “Frank’s death is really, really sad news for everybody associated with the museum and culture across the North-East. The work he did and the vision he had for the museum in selecting the site and bringing all of the local authorities together in those days was virtually unheard of. His vision for the museum was for it to be immersed in the culture of the region and that is what we have got. It is magnificent and that is his lasting legacy”.

Publications
As well as an autobiography, The Man Who Made Beamish, Atkinson also wrote several books on the history and traditional pastimes of the North East – amongst them leek growing and pigeon fancying.

Books

Articles 
Atkinson also wrote a number of articles in journals and magazines.

http://pubs-newcomen.com/tfiles/33p031.pdf

References 

1924 births
2014 deaths
Directors of museums in the United Kingdom
Commanders of the Order of the British Empire